Roger Graham Hackney (born 2 September 1957) is a Welsh former long-distance runner who specialised in the 3000 metres steeplechase. He represented Great Britain in three Olympic Games and won a silver medal for Wales at the 1986 Commonwealth Games.

Biography
Hackney, who was a member of the Royal Air Force, and trained at Aldershot, Farnham and District AC, specialised in the 3000m steeplechase. He made his Olympics debut as a 22-year old at the 1980 Moscow Games and was seventh in his semi-final, only just missing out on a spot in the final, with the next best time of the competitors that missed out.

At the 1983 World Championships in Helsinki, Hackney came fifth in the final of the steeplechase.

His best performance in the Olympics came at the 1984 Los Angeles Games where he ran the semi-final in 8:20.77 and qualified for the final, in which he finished 10th.

He won a silver medal representing Wales in the steeplechase at the 1986 Commonwealth Games, in a time of 8:25.15, behind Canada's Graeme Fell and ahead of Colin Reitz, another British athlete. The field was weakened by the absence of many African countries, most notably Kenya, which boycotted the competition over the Thatcher government's sporting links with apartheid South Africa. In 1986 he was also eighth at the European Championships.

He was part of the Great British Olympic team for a third and final time at the 1988 Seoul Games. By then aged 31, Hackney once more made it to the semi-final stage, but was unable to complete the race and didn't register a time.

His personal best time, 8:18.91, is a Welsh record and was set in 1988, while competing in Belgium. He is the only non Belgian man to win the Lotto Cross Cup.

He now works in Leeds as an orthopaedic surgeon.

International competitions
 All results regarding 3000 metres steeplechase unless stated otherwise.

References

External links

Roger Hackney at Sports Reference

1957 births
Living people
Sportspeople from Swansea
Welsh male long-distance runners
Olympic athletes of Great Britain
Athletes (track and field) at the 1980 Summer Olympics
Athletes (track and field) at the 1984 Summer Olympics
Athletes (track and field) at the 1988 Summer Olympics
Commonwealth Games silver medallists for Wales
Commonwealth Games medallists in athletics
Athletes (track and field) at the 1982 Commonwealth Games
Athletes (track and field) at the 1986 Commonwealth Games
Athletes (track and field) at the 1990 Commonwealth Games
World Athletics Championships athletes for Great Britain
Medallists at the 1986 Commonwealth Games